Walter Bradley (born September 29, 1945) is a Canadian politician. He represented 2nd Kings in the Legislative Assembly of Prince Edward Island from 1989 to 1996 as a Liberal.

Bradley was born in 1945 in St. Theresa's, Prince Edward Island. He married Florence Kelly in 1968. Bradley graduated from the University of Prince Edward Island with a Bachelor of Education degree, and from Dalhousie University with a master's degree in education. He was a teacher by career, and later was principal of Morell Regional High School.

Bradley entered provincial politics in 1989, when he was elected a councillor for the electoral district of 2nd Kings. He was re-elected in the 1993 election. On April 15, 1993, Bradley was appointed to the Executive Council of Prince Edward Island as Minister of Agriculture, Fisheries and Forestry. In the 1996 election, Bradley was defeated by Progressive Conservative Kevin MacAdam in the new Morell-Fortune Bay riding.

References

1945 births
Living people
Members of the Executive Council of Prince Edward Island
Prince Edward Island Liberal Party MLAs
University of Prince Edward Island alumni
Dalhousie University alumni
Canadian schoolteachers